Sir Fred Hoyle FRS (24 June 1915 – 20 August 2001) was an English astronomer who formulated the theory of stellar nucleosynthesis and was one of the authors of the influential B2FH paper. He also held controversial stances on other scientific matters—in particular his rejection of the "Big Bang" theory (a term coined by him on BBC Radio) in favor of the "steady-state model", and his promotion of panspermia as the origin of life on Earth. He also wrote science fiction novels, short stories and radio plays, and co-authored twelve books with his son, Geoffrey Hoyle. He spent most of his working life at the Institute of Astronomy at Cambridge and served as its director for six years.

Biography

Early life
Hoyle was born near Bingley in Gilstead, West Riding of Yorkshire, England. His father, Ben Hoyle, who was a violinist and worked in the wool trade in Bradford, served as a machine gunner in the First World War. His mother, Mabel Pickard, had studied music at the Royal College of Music in London and later worked as a cinema pianist. Hoyle was educated at Bingley Grammar School and read mathematics at Emmanuel College, Cambridge. In his youth, he sang in the choir at the local Anglican church.

In 1936, he won the Mayhew Prize (jointly with George Stanley Rushbrooke).

Career
In late 1940, Hoyle left Cambridge to go to Portsmouth to work for the Admiralty on radar research, for example devising a method to get the altitude of the incoming aeroplanes. He was also put in charge of countermeasures against the radar guided guns found on the Graf Spee after its scuttling in the River Plate. Britain's radar project employed more personnel than the Manhattan project, and was probably the inspiration for the large British project in Hoyle's novel The Black Cloud. Two colleagues in this war work were Hermann Bondi and Thomas Gold, and the three had many and deep discussions on cosmology. The radar work paid for a couple of trips to North America, where he took the opportunity to visit astronomers. On one trip to the US, he learned about supernovae at Caltech and Mount Palomar and, in Canada, the nuclear physics of plutonium implosion and explosion, noticed some similarity between the two and started thinking about supernova nucleosynthesis. He had an intuition at the time "I will make a name for myself if this works out." Eventually (1954) his prescient and ground breaking paper came out. He also formed a group at Cambridge exploring stellar nucleosynthesis in ordinary stars and was bothered by the paucity of stellar carbon production in existing models. He noticed that one of the existing processes would be made a billion times more productive if the carbon-12 nucleus had a resonance at 7.7 MeV, but the nuclear physicists did not list such a one. On another trip, he visited the nuclear physics group at Caltech, spending a few months of sabbatical there and persuaded them against their considerable scepticism to look for and find the Hoyle state in carbon-12, from which developed a full theory of stellar nucleosynthesis, co-authored by Hoyle with some members of the Caltech group.

After the war, in 1945, Hoyle returned to Cambridge University, as a lecturer at St John's College, Cambridge. Hoyle's Cambridge years, 1945–1973, saw him rise to the top of world astrophysics theory, on the basis of a startling originality of ideas covering a very wide range of topics. In 1958, Hoyle was appointed  Plumian Professor of Astronomy and Experimental Philosophy in Cambridge University. In 1967, he became the founding director of the Institute of Theoretical Astronomy (subsequently renamed the Institute of Astronomy, Cambridge), where his innovative leadership quickly led to this institution becoming one of the premier groups in the world for theoretical astrophysics. In 1971, he was invited to deliver the MacMillan Memorial Lecture to the Institution of Engineers and Shipbuilders in Scotland. He chose the subject "Astronomical Instruments and their Construction". Hoyle was knighted in 1972. Hoyle resigned his Plumian professor position in 1972 and his directorship of the institute in 1973, with this move effectively cutting him off from most of his establishment power-base, connections and steady salary.

After leaving Cambridge, Hoyle wrote many popular science and science fiction books, as well as presenting lectures around the world.  Part of the motivation for this was simply to provide a means of support. Hoyle was still a member of the joint policy committee (since 1967), during the planning stage for the 150-inch Anglo-Australian Telescope at Siding Spring Observatory in New South Wales. He became chairman of the Anglo-Australian Telescope board in 1973, and presided at its inauguration in 1974 by Charles, Prince of Wales.

Decline and death

After his resignation from Cambridge, Hoyle moved to the Lake District and occupied his time with a mix of treks across the moors, writing books, visiting research centres around the world, and working on science ideas that have been nearly universally rejected. On 24 November 1997, while hiking across moorlands in west Yorkshire, near his childhood home in Gilstead, Hoyle fell into a steep ravine called Shipley Glen. Roughly twelve hours later, Hoyle was found by a search dog. He was hospitalised for two months with pneumonia and kidney problems (both resulting from hypothermia), as well as a broken shoulder from the fall. Thereafter he entered a marked decline, suffering from memory and mental agility problems. In 2001, he suffered a series of strokes and died in Bournemouth on 20 August of that year.

Views and contributions

Origin of nucleosynthesis
Hoyle authored the first two research papers ever published on the synthesis of the chemical elements heavier than helium by nuclear reactions in stars. The first of these in 1946 showed that the cores of stars will evolve to temperatures of billions of degrees, much hotter than temperatures considered for thermonuclear origin of stellar power in main-sequence stars. Hoyle showed that at such high temperatures the element iron can become much more abundant than other heavy elements owing to thermal equilibrium among nuclear particles, explaining the high natural abundance of iron. This idea would later be called the e Process. Hoyle's second foundational nucleosynthesis publication, published in 1954, showed that the elements between carbon and iron cannot be synthesized by such equilibrium processes. He attributed those elements to specific nuclear fusion reactions between abundant constituents in concentric shells of evolved massive, pre-supernova stars. This startlingly modern picture is the accepted paradigm today for the supernova nucleosynthesis of these primary elements. In the mid-1950s, Hoyle became the leader of a group of very talented experimental and theoretical physicists who met in Cambridge: William Alfred Fowler, Margaret Burbidge, and Geoffrey Burbidge. This group systematized basic ideas of how all the chemical elements in our universe were created, with this now being a field called nucleosynthesis. Famously, in 1957, this group produced the B2FH paper (known for the initials of the four authors) in which the field of nucleosynthesis was organized into complementary nuclear processes. They also added much new material on the synthesis of heavy elements by neutron-capture reactions, the so-called s process and the r process. So influential did the B2FH paper become that for the remainder of the twentieth century it became the default citation of almost all researchers wishing to cite an accepted origin for nucleosynthesis theory, and as a result, the path-breaking Hoyle 1954 paper fell into obscurity. Historical research in the 21st century  has brought Hoyle's 1954 paper back to scientific prominence. Those historical arguments were first presented to a gathering of nucleosynthesis experts attending a 2007 conference at Caltech organized after the deaths of both Fowler and Hoyle to celebrate the 50th anniversary of the publication of B2FH. Ironically the B2FH paper did not review Hoyle's 1954 supernova-shells attribution of the origin of elements between silicon and iron despite Hoyle's co-authorship of B2FH. Based on his many personal discussions with Hoyle  Donald D. Clayton has attributed this seemingly inexplicable oversight in B2FH to the lack of proofreading by Hoyle of the draft composed at Caltech in 1956 by G.R. Burbidge and E.M. Burbidge.

The second of Hoyle's nucleosynthesis papers also introduced an interesting use of the anthropic principle, which was not then known by that name. In trying to work out the routes of stellar nucleosynthesis, Hoyle calculated that one particular nuclear reaction, the triple-alpha process, which generates carbon from helium, would require the carbon nucleus to have a very specific resonance energy and spin for it to work. The large amount of carbon in the universe, which makes it possible for carbon-based life-forms of any kind to exist, demonstrated to Hoyle that this nuclear reaction must work. Based on this notion, Hoyle therefore predicted the values of the energy, the nuclear spin and the parity of the compound state in the carbon nucleus formed by three alpha particles (helium nuclei), which was later borne out by experiment.

This energy level, while needed to produce carbon in large quantities, was statistically very unlikely to fall where it does in the scheme of carbon energy levels. Hoyle later wrote:

His co-worker William Alfred Fowler eventually won the Nobel Prize for Physics in 1983 (with Subrahmanyan Chandrasekhar), but for some reason Hoyle's original contribution was overlooked by the electors, and many were surprised that such a notable astronomer missed out. Fowler himself in an autobiographical sketch affirmed Hoyle's pioneering efforts:

Rejection of the Big Bang
While having no argument with the Lemaître theory (later confirmed by Edwin Hubble's observations) that the universe was expanding, Hoyle disagreed on its interpretation. He found the idea that the universe had a beginning to be pseudoscience, resembling arguments for a creator, "for it's an irrational process, and can't be described in scientific terms" (see Kalam cosmological argument). Instead, Hoyle, along with Thomas Gold and Hermann Bondi (with whom he had worked on radar in the Second World War), in 1948 began to argue for the universe as being in a "steady state" and formulated their Steady State theory.  The theory tried to explain how the universe could be eternal and essentially unchanging while still having the galaxies we observe moving away from each other. The theory hinged on the creation of matter between galaxies over time, so that even though galaxies get further apart, new ones that develop between them fill the space they leave. The resulting universe is in a "steady state" in the same manner that a flowing river is—the individual water molecules are moving away but the overall river remains the same.

The theory was one alternative to the Big Bang which, like the Big Bang, agreed with key observations of the day, namely Hubble's red shift observations, and Hoyle was a strong critic of the Big Bang. He coined the term "Big Bang" on BBC radio's Third Programme broadcast on 28 March 1949. It was said by George Gamow and his opponents that Hoyle intended to be pejorative, and the script from which he read aloud was interpreted by his opponents to be "vain, one-sided, insulting, not worthy of the BBC". Hoyle explicitly denied that he was being insulting and said it was just a striking image meant to emphasize the difference between the two theories for the radio audience. In another BBC interview, he said, "The reason why scientists like the "big bang" is because they are overshadowed by the Book of Genesis. It is deep within the psyche of most scientists to believe in the first page of Genesis".

Hoyle had a famously heated argument with Martin Ryle of the Cavendish Radio Astronomy Group about Hoyle's steady state theory, which somewhat restricted collaboration between the Cavendish group and the Cambridge Institute of Astronomy during the 1960s.

Hoyle, unlike Gold and Bondi, offered an explanation for the appearance of new matter by postulating the existence of what he dubbed the "creation field", or just the "C-field", which had negative pressure in order to be consistent with the conservation of energy and drive the expansion of the universe. This C-field is the same as the later "de Sitter solution" for cosmic inflation, but the C-field model acts much slower than the de Sitter inflation model. They jointly argued that continuous creation was no more inexplicable than the appearance of the entire universe from nothing, although it had to be done on a regular basis. In the end, mounting observational evidence convinced most cosmologists that the steady state model was incorrect and that the Big Bang was the theory that agreed better with observations, although Hoyle continued to support and develop his theory. In 1993, in an attempt to explain some of the evidence against the steady state theory, he presented a modified version called "quasi-steady state cosmology" (QSS), but the theory is not widely accepted.

The evidence that resulted in the Big Bang's victory over the steady state model included the discovery of the cosmic microwave background radiation in the 1960s, and the distribution of "young galaxies" and quasars throughout the Universe in the 1980s indicate a more consistent age estimate of the universe. Hoyle died in 2001 having never accepted the validity of the Big Bang theory.

Theory of gravity
Together with Narlikar, Hoyle developed a particle theory in the 1960s, the Hoyle–Narlikar theory of gravity. It made predictions that were roughly the same as Einstein's general relativity, but it incorporated Mach's Principle, which Einstein had tried but failed to incorporate in his theory. The Hoyle-Narlikar theory fails several tests, including consistency with the microwave background. It was motivated by their belief in the steady state model of the universe.

Rejection of Earth-based abiogenesis
In his later years, Hoyle became a staunch critic of theories of abiogenesis to explain the origin of life on Earth. With Chandra Wickramasinghe, Hoyle promoted the hypothesis that the first life on Earth began in space, spreading through the universe via panspermia, and that evolution on Earth is influenced by a steady influx of viruses arriving via comets. His belief that comets had a significant percentage of organic compounds was well ahead of his time, as the dominant views in the 1970s and 1980s were that comets largely consisted of water-ice, and the presence of organic compounds was then highly controversial. Wickramasinghe wrote in 2003: "In the highly polarized polemic between Darwinism and creationism, our position is unique. Although we do not align ourselves with either side, both sides treat us as opponents. Thus we are outsiders with an unusual perspective—and our suggestion for a way out of the crisis has not yet been considered."

Hoyle and Wickramasinghe advanced several instances where they say outbreaks of illnesses on Earth are of extraterrestrial origins, including the 1918 flu pandemic, and certain outbreaks of polio and mad cow disease. For the 1918 flu pandemic, they hypothesized that cometary dust brought the virus to Earth simultaneously at multiple locations—a view almost universally dismissed by experts on this pandemic. In 1982, Hoyle presented Evolution from Space for the Royal Institution's Omni Lecture. After considering what he thought of as a very remote possibility of Earth-based abiogenesis he concluded:

Published in his 1982/1984 books Evolution from Space (co-authored with Chandra Wickramasinghe), Hoyle calculated that the chance of obtaining the required set of enzymes for even the simplest living cell without panspermia was one in 1040,000. Since the number of atoms in the known universe is infinitesimally tiny by comparison (1080), he argued that Earth as life's place of origin could be ruled out. He claimed:

Though Hoyle declared himself an atheist, this apparent suggestion of a guiding hand led him to the conclusion that "a superintellect has monkeyed with physics, as well as with chemistry and biology, and ... there are no blind forces worth speaking about in nature." He would go on to compare the random emergence of even the simplest cell without panspermia to the likelihood that "a tornado sweeping through a junk-yard might assemble a Boeing 747 from the materials therein" and to compare the chance of obtaining even a single functioning protein by chance combination of amino acids to a solar system full of blind men solving Rubik's Cubes simultaneously. This is known as "the junkyard tornado", or "Hoyle’s Fallacy". Those who advocate the intelligent design (ID) philosophy sometimes cite Hoyle's work in this area to support the claim that the universe was fine tuned in order to allow intelligent life to be possible.

Other controversies
While Hoyle was well-regarded for his works on nucleosynthesis and science popularization, he held controversial positions on a wide range of scientific issues, often in direct opposition to the prevailing theories of the scientific community. Paul Davies describes how he "loved his maverick personality and contempt for orthodoxy", quoting Hoyle as saying "I don't care what they think" about his theories on discrepant redshift, and "it is better to be interesting and wrong than boring and right".

Hoyle often expressed anger against the labyrinthine and petty politics at Cambridge and frequently feuded with members and institutions of all levels of the British astronomy community, leading to his resignation from Cambridge in September 1971 over the way he thought Donald Lynden-Bell was chosen to replace retiring professor Roderick Oliver Redman behind his back. According to biographer Simon Mitton, Hoyle was crestfallen because he felt that his colleagues at Cambridge were unsupportive.

In addition to his views on steady state theory and panspermia, Hoyle also supported the following controversial hypotheses and speculations:
 The correlation of flu epidemics with the sunspot cycle, with epidemics occurring at the minimum of the cycle. The idea was that flu contagion was scattered in the interstellar medium and reached Earth only when the solar wind had minimum power.
 Two fossil Archaeopteryx were man-made fakes. This assertion was definitively refuted by, among other strong indications, the presence of microcracks extending through the fossils into the surrounding rock.
 The theory of abiogenic petroleum, held by Hoyle and by Thomas Gold, where natural hydrocarbons (oil and natural gas) are explained as the result of deep carbon deposits, instead of fossilized organic material. This theory is dismissed by the mainstream petroleum geochemistry community.
 In his 1977 book On Stonehenge, Hoyle supported Gerald Hawkins's proposal that the fifty-six Aubrey holes at Stonehenge were used as a system for neolithic Britons to predict eclipses, using them in the daily positioning of marker stones.  The use of the Aubrey holes for predicting lunar eclipses was originally proposed by Gerald Hawkins in his book of the subject Stonehenge Decoded (1965).

Nobel Physics Prizes
Hoyle was also at the centre of two unrelated controversies involving the politics for selecting the winner of the Nobel Prize for Physics. The first came when the 1974 prize went, in part, to Antony Hewish for his leading role in the discovery of pulsars. Promptly Hoyle made an off-the-cuff remark to a reporter in Montreal that "Yes, Jocelyn Bell was the actual discoverer, not Hewish, who was her supervisor, so she should have been included." This remark received widespread international coverage. Worried about being misunderstood, Hoyle carefully composed a letter of explanation to The Times.

The second controversy came when the 1983 prize went in part to William Alfred Fowler "for his theoretical and experimental studies of the nuclear reactions of importance in the formation of the chemical elements in the universe." The controversy arose because Hoyle had been the inventor of the theory of nucleosynthesis in the stars with two research papers published shortly after WWII. So some suspicion arose that Hoyle was denied the third share of this prize because of his earlier public disagreement with the 1974 award. British scientist Harry Kroto later said that the Nobel Prize is not just an award for a piece of work, but a recognition of a scientist's overall reputation and Hoyle's championing many disreputable and disproven ideas may have invalidated him. In Nature, editor John Maddox called it "shameful" that Fowler had been rewarded with a Nobel prize and Hoyle had not.

Media appearances
Hoyle appeared in a series of radio talks on astronomy for the BBC in the 1950s; these were collected in the book The Nature of the Universe, and he went on to write a number of other popular science books.

In the play Sur la route de Montalcino, the character of Fred Hoyle confronts Georges Lemaître on a fictional journey to the Vatican in 1957.

Hoyle also appeared in the 1973 short film Take the World From Another Point of View.

In the 2004 television movie Hawking, Fred Hoyle is played by Peter Firth. In the movie, Stephen Hawking (played by Benedict Cumberbatch) publicly confronts Hoyle at a Royal Society lecture in summer 1964, about a mistake he found in his latest publication.

Honours

Awards
 Elected a member of the American Academy of Arts and Sciences (1964)
 Elected a Fellow of the Royal Society (FRS) in 1957
 Gold Medal of the Royal Astronomical Society (1968)
 Bakerian Lecture (1968)
 Elected member of the United States National Academy of Sciences (1969)
 Bruce Medal (1970)
 Henry Norris Russell Lectureship (1971)
 Jansky Lectureship before the National Radio Astronomy Observatory
 Knighthood (1972)
 President of the Royal Astronomical Society (1971–1973)
 Royal Medal (1974)
 Klumpke-Roberts Award of the Astronomical Society of the Pacific (1977)
 Elected member of the American Philosophical Society (1980)
 Balzan Prize for Astrophysics: evolution of stars (1994, with Martin Schwarzschild)
 Crafoord Prize from the Royal Swedish Academy of Sciences, with Edwin Salpeter (1997)

Named after him
 Hoyle Building, Institute of Astronomy, Cambridge
 Asteroid 8077 Hoyle
 Janibacter hoylei, species of bacteria discovered by ISRO scientists
 Sir Fred Hoyle Way, a stretch of the A650 dual carriageway in Bingley.
 Institute of Physics Fred Hoyle Medal and Prize

Memorabilia
The Fred Hoyle Collection at St John's College Library contains "a pair of walking boots, five boxes of photographs, two ice axes, some dental X-rays, a telescope, ten large film reels and an unpublished opera" in addition to 150 document boxes of papers.

Bibliography

Non-fiction
 The Nature of the Universe – a series of broadcast lectures, Basil Blackwell, Oxford 1950 (early use of the big bang phrase)
 Frontiers of Astronomy, Heinemann Education Books Limited, London, 1955. The Internet Archive. HarperCollins, 
 Burbidge, E.M., Burbidge, G.R., Fowler, W.A. and Hoyle, F., "Synthesis of the Elements in Stars" , Revs. Mod. Physics 29:547–650, 1957, the famous B2FH paper after their initials, for which Hoyle is most famous among professional cosmologists.
 Astronomy, A history of man's investigation of the universe, Crescent Books, Inc., London 1962, 
 Of men and galaxies, Seattle University of Washington, 1964, 
 Galaxies, Nuclei, and Quasars, Harper & Row, Publishers, New York, 1965, 
 Nicolaus Copernicus, Heinemann Educational Books Ltd., London, p. 78, 1973
 Astronomy and Cosmology: A Modern Course, 1975, 
 Energy or Extinction? The case for nuclear energy, 1977, Heinemann Educational Books Limited, . In this provocative book Hoyle establishes the dependence of Western civilization on energy consumption and predicts that nuclear fission as a source of energy is essential for its survival.
 Ten Faces of the Universe, 1977, W.H. Freeman and Company (San Francisco), 
 On Stonehenge, 1977, London : Heinemann Educational, ;  San Francisco: W.H. Freeman and Company,  pbk.
 Lifecloud – The Origin of Life in the Universe, Hoyle, F. and Wickramasinghe C., J.M. Dent and Sons, 1978. 
 Diseases from Space (with Chandra Wickramasinghe) (J.M. Dent, London, 1979)
 Commonsense in Nuclear Energy, Fred Hoyle and Geoffrey Hoyle, 1980, Heinemann Educational Books Ltd., 
 The big bang in astronomy, New Scientist 92(1280):527, 19 November 1981.
 Ice, the Ultimate Human Catastrophe,1981,   Snippet view from Google Books
 The Intelligent Universe, 1983
 From Grains to Bacteria, Hoyle, F. and Wickramasinghe N.C., University College Cardiff Press, 1984
 Evolution from space (the Omni lecture) and other papers on the origin of life 1982, 
 Evolution from Space: A Theory of Cosmic Creationism, 1984, 
 Viruses from Space, 1986, 
 With Jayant Narlikar and Chandra Wickramasinghe, The extragalactic universe: an alternative view, Nature 346:807–812, 30 August 1990.
 The Origin of the Universe and the Origin of Religion,1993,  
 Home Is Where the Wind Blows: Chapters from a Cosmologist's Life (autobiography) Oxford University Press 1994,  
 Mathematics of Evolution, (1987) University College Cardiff Press, (1999) Acorn Enterprises LLC., 
 With G. Burbridge and Narlikar J.V. A Different Approach to Cosmology, Cambridge University Press 2000,

Science fiction

Hoyle also wrote science fiction. In his first novel, The Black Cloud, most intelligent life in the universe takes the form of interstellar gas clouds; they are surprised to learn that intelligent life can also form on planets. He wrote a television series, A for Andromeda, which was also published as a novel.  His play Rockets in Ursa Major had a professional production at the Mermaid Theatre in 1962.
 The Black Cloud, 1957
 Ossian's Ride, 1959
 A for Andromeda, 1962 (co-authored with John Elliot)
 Fifth Planet, 1963 (co-authored with Geoffrey Hoyle)
 Andromeda Breakthrough, 1965 (co-authored with John Elliot)
 October the First Is Too Late, 1966
 Element 79 (collection of short stories), 1967
 Rockets in Ursa Major, 1969 (co-authored with Geoffrey Hoyle)
 Seven Steps to the Sun, 1970 (co-authored with Geoffrey Hoyle)
 The Inferno, 10/1973 (co-authored with Geoffrey Hoyle)
 The Molecule Men and the Monster of Loch Ness, 1973 (co-authored with Geoffrey Hoyle)
 Into Deepest Space, 1974 (co-authored with Geoffrey Hoyle)
 The Incandescent Ones, 1977 (co-authored with Geoffrey Hoyle)
 The Westminster Disaster, 1978 (co-authored with Geoffrey Hoyle and Edited by Barbara Hoyle)
 Comet Halley, 11/1985
 The Frozen Planet of Azuron, 1982 (co-authored with Geoffrey Hoyle)
 The Energy Pirate, 1982 (Ladybird Books, co-authored with Geoffrey Hoyle)
 The Planet of Death, 1982 (Ladybird Books, co-authored with Geoffrey Hoyle)
 The Giants of Universal Park, 1982 (co-authored with Geoffrey Hoyle)
Most of these are independent of each other.  Andromeda Breakthrough is a sequel to A for Andromeda and Into Deepest Space is a sequel to Rockets in Ursa Major. The four Ladybird Books are intended for children.

Some stories of the collection Element 79 are fantasy, in particular "Welcome to Slippage City" and "The Judgement of Aphrodite".  Both introduce mythological characters.

The Telegraph (UK) called him a "masterful" science fiction writer.

References

Further reading
 Alan P. Lightman and Roberta Brawer, Origins: The Lives and Worlds of Modern Cosmologists, Harvard University Press, 1990.  A collection of interviews, mostly with the generation (or two) of cosmologists after Hoyle, but also including an interview with Hoyle himself.  Several interviewees testify to Hoyle's influence in popularizing astronomy and cosmology.
 Dennis Overbye, Lonely Hearts of the Cosmos: The Scientific Quest for the Secret of the Universe, HarperCollins, 1991.   Second edition (with new afterword), Back Bay, 1999.  Gives a biographical account of modern cosmology in a novel-like fashion.  Complementary to Origins.
 Simon Mitton, Fred Hoyle: A Life in Science, Cambridge University Press, 2011. 
 Douglas Gough, editor, The Scientific Legacy of Fred Hoyle, Cambridge University Press, 2005. 
 Chandra Wickramasinghe, A Journey with Fred Hoyle, World Scientific Pub, 2005. .
 Jane Gregory, Fred Hoyle's Universe, Oxford University Press, 2005. 
 A Journey with Frey Hoyle: Second Edition by Chandra Wickramasinghe, World Scientific Publishing Co. 2013.

External links

 Fred Hoyle Website
 Fred Hoyle and Chandra Wickramasinghe Website
 Obituary by Sir Martin Rees in Physics Today
 Obituary by Bernard Lovell in The Guardian
 
 Fred Hoyle: An Online Exhibition
 An Interview with Fred Hoyle, 5 July 1996
 
 
 Fred Hoyle at the Notable Names Database
 

20th-century British astronomers
English science fiction writers
British cosmologists
Panspermia
Alumni of Emmanuel College, Cambridge
Fellows of St John's College, Cambridge
Fellows of the Royal Society
Foreign associates of the National Academy of Sciences
Knights Bachelor
English agnostics
Kalinga Prize recipients
People from Bingley
1915 births
2001 deaths
Royal Medal winners
Recipients of the Gold Medal of the Royal Astronomical Society
People educated at Bingley Grammar School
Presidents of the Royal Astronomical Society
20th-century British novelists
English male novelists
British  atheists
20th-century atheists
20th-century English male writers
Plumian Professors of Astronomy and Experimental Philosophy
Members of the American Philosophical Society